Calulo is a town, with a population of 44,000 (2014), and a commune in the municipality of Libolo, province of Cuanza Sul, Angola and the seat of the municipality.

Calulo is the hometown of the popular football team Clube Recreativo Desportivo do Libolo.

See also
Estádio Municipal de Calulo

External links
Town of Calulo
CRD Libolo official website

References

Populated places in Cuanza Sul Province
Communes in Cuanza Sul Province